Bryan Acheampong (born 27 November 1972) is a Ghanaian politician and Member of Parliament of Abetifi constituency in the Eastern Region of Ghana. He is a member of the New Patriotic Party of Ghana. He succeeded Peter Wiafe Pepera, who died while in office. He was the Minister of State at the Ministry of Interior between February 2019 to 2020. In 2016, he bought Okwawu United F.C.

Early life and education 
He was born on 27 November 1972 in Suhum in the Eastern region of Ghana. Bryan hails from Nkwatia in the Kwahu East District of Ghana. He had his basic school at the Achimota Primary School and continued to the Presbyterian Boys Secondary School in Legon. He graduated from the Johnson and Wales University in the USA with a bachelor's degree and an MBA in Business Administration. He is a PhD candidate in Information Systems at the University of Ghana. He has a Certificate from the Massachusetts Institute of Technology. He also has an HP Accredited Sales Professional from the HP University.

Career 
He served in the US Air Force between 2004 and 2006. He was the Minister of State in charge of National Security after he was appointed and sworn in the Office of the Presidency. He is a Consultant. He was the CEO of INTU-Group in Accra. He is currently the Deputy Minister of State in charge of Interior.

Politics 
He is a member of the New Patriotic Party. He is the member of parliament for Abetifi Constituency in the Eastern region of Ghana.

2016 election 
In the 2016 Ghanaian general election, he won the Abetifi Constituency parliamentary seat with 23,432 votes making 74.61% of the total votes cast whilst the NDC parliamentary candidate Tabi Emmanuel had 7,975 votes making 25.39% of the total votes cast.

2020 election 
In the 2020 Ghanaian general election, he again won the Abetifi Constituency parliamentary seat with 25,035 votes making 72.42% of the total votes cast whilst the NDC parliamentary candidate Samuel Asamoah had 9,536 votes making 27.58% of the total votes cast.

Committees 
He is the Chairperson of the Foreign Affairs Committee, a member of the Defense and Interior Committee, a member of the Appointments Committee and also a member of the Committee of Selection Committee.

Personal life 
He is not married. He is a Christian and worships as a Presbyterian.

Philanthropy 
In July 2019, he presented a 150kv generator to the Presbyterian College of Education (ABETICO) at Abetifi in the Eastern Region.

In August 2019, Bryan through the Bryan Acheampong Foundation donated GH¢250,000 cheque to the Presbyterian University College.

In April 2020, he presented over ¢820,000 to Afram Plains North, Afram Plains South, Abirem, Mpraeso, Nkawkaw, Abetifi and Suhum.

In February 2021, he supported in the construction of over 100 boreholes in Abetifi, Pampaso, Abetifi Christian Quarters, Nkwatia, Kwahu-Tafo, Bokuruwa, Nteso, Ankomah, Akwasiho, Dwerebease and Suminakese.

In July 2021, he presented farm inputs worth ¢500,000 to over 6,000 farmers in the Kwahu East District to aid in their farming work.

In January 2022, he gave a Suzuki Swift SRS Vehicle to the best Midwife in the Abetifi Constituency.

In August 2022, he donated ¢170,000, 42 sewing machines and 26 hair dryers to the Dressmakers and Hairdressers Associations in his constituency.

Honors 
In April 2020, he was lauded by the management of Kasapreko Company Limited for his support against COVID-19 pandemic.

In August 2021, Ghana National Association of Teachers honored Bryan for giving scholarships to their members in the Kwahu East District.

References 

New Patriotic Party politicians
Ghanaian MPs 2013–2017
Ghanaian MPs 2017–2021
Government ministers of Ghana
Living people
Johnson & Wales University alumni
People from Eastern Region (Ghana)
1972 births
Ghanaian Presbyterians
Presbyterian Boys' Senior High School alumni
Ghanaian MPs 2021–2025